The Philippine twenty-peso note (Filipino: Dalawampung piso (formal), beinte pesos (vernacular)) (₱20) is a denomination of Philippine currency. It is the smallest banknote denomination in general circulation in the Philippines. Philippine president Manuel L. Quezon is currently featured on the front side of the note, while the Banaue Rice Terraces and the Asian palm civet is featured on the reverse side.

History

Pre-independence
1905-1917: Philippine Islands Silver Certificates issued with an image of the Mayon Volcano.
1920-1933: Bank of the Philippine Islands issued notes.
1917-1936: Philippine National Bank issued notes, features congressman William A. Jones on the obverse.
1918-1935: Philippine Treasury Certificates issued with an image of the Mayon Volcano.
1937: Philippine Commonwealth issued treasury certificate which features an image of the Mayon Volcano. This series were later overprinted with the word "VICTORY" on the reverse after the liberation of the Philippines under Japanese rule in 1944.
1949: Philippine Victory, Central Bank of the Philippines Victory issues of 20 peso bill image of the Mayon Volcano.

Version history

Independence
Quezon first appeared on the twenty peso bill upon the release of the Pilipino series notes in 1967.

English series (1951–1971) 
The obverse features the portraits of Andrés Bonifacio and Emilio Jacinto, two important figures of the Katipunan movement during the Philippine Revolution. The reverse features the Kartilya ng Katipunan, and the Cry of Balintawak Monument.

Pilipino series (1969–1973) 
In 1967, Manuel L. Quezon replaced the portraits of Bonifacio and Jacinto. The note is now predominantly orange in color. On the reverse, it now features the Malacañan Palace. The design of the obverse was later revised, the font for the text Republika ng Pilipinas and Dalawampung Piso was changed, and the color of the portrait of Quezon was changed from brown to orange and geometric lines were added on the sides and the watermark area of the note. This design was later used when the Ang Bagong Lipunan series was released in 1973.

Ang Bagong Lipunan series (1973–1985) 
In 1973, the "Ang Bagong Lipunan" text was added and was overprinted on the watermark area.

New Design series (1986–2012) 
In 1986, the note was completely redesigned and new elements regarding Quezon's accomplishments were added on the right side, namely the establishment of Tagalog as the Philippine national language (Wikang Pambansa), the coat-of-arms of the Commonwealth and the approval of the 1935 Constitution (Saligang Batas 1935). The Malacañang Palace picture at the reverse was updated to reflect the renovations to the building itself. It was released on March 3, 1986, months after the People Power Revolution. Despite being released after People Power, the first 34 million banknotes have the signature of President Ferdinand Marcos. The banknote was designed by Angel Cacnio.

After the creation of the Bangko Sentral ng Pilipinas in 1993, its new logo was incorporated on all the New Design series bills.

In 1998, the year of printing was added at the bottom of the denomination value located at the upper left corner of the obverse. The names of the signatories on the bills were later added starting with banknotes featuring the signature of President Joseph Estrada.

New Generation series (2010–present) 
In 2010, the portrait of Manuel L. Quezon was revised and the Malacañang Palace was moved from the reverse to the bottom center of the obverse. The reverse now features the Banaue Rice Terraces and the Asian palm civet.

In 2017, an updated version of the New Generation series 20 peso banknote was issued with changes in the font size of the year of issue and the italicization of the scientific name on the reverse side.

In 2019, the 20 peso note will be replaced by a coin that will be released in the first quarter of 2020 to solve the overuse of this banknote, as it only takes a year or less to planned replace it with a new banknote based on a research by the University of the Philippines. The Bangko Sentral ng Pilipinas states that the new 20 peso coin lasts for 10 to 15 years, longer than a 20 peso banknote. Although the P20 coin is in circulation the BSP continued to issue P20 banknotes as of 2023.

The new BSP logo which was redesigned in January 2021 was adopted in all NGC banknotes starting with the 2022 issued banknotes featuring the signatures of President Ferdinand Marcos Jr. and BSP Governor Felipe Medalla.

Version history

Commemorative issues
Throughout its existence, the twenty peso bill has often been overprinted to commemorate certain events, namely:
International Year of Microcredit commemorative bill - On November 1, 2004, as part of the world launching of the United Nations Year of Microcredit in 2005, the Bangko Sentral ng Pilipinas issued 10 million pieces of the 20 peso bill with an overprint of the official logo and the phrase "Sustainable Microfinance Services for the Filipino Entrepreneurial Poor" on the bottom. The version with the signature of Amando M. Tetangco, Jr. was released in 2005.
''60 years of Central Banking'' commemorative bill - On July 9, 2009, the Bangko Sentral ng Pilipinas introduced 12 million banknotes (2 million banknotes for each denomination) with an overprint commemorating 60 years of central banking. The overprint appears on the watermark area on all six circulating denominations.

Printing years

Notes

See also
 Philippine twenty-peso coin, its equivalent coin circulating alongside its original banknote

Banknotes of the Philippines
Twenty-base-unit banknotes